Martin is an upcoming Indian Kannada-language action thriller film directed by A. P. Arjun from a story written by Arjun Sarja. The film is produced by Uday K. Mehta and distributed by T-series. It stars Dhruva Sarja, Vaibhavi Shandilya, Anveshi Jain, Achyuth Kumar and Nikitin Dheer.

Cast

Music 
The music rights for Martin were bought by Lahari Music and T-Series for Hindi and south languages.

Release 
The film's teaser was released on 23 February 2023 and gained 70 million views within three days. It is also scheduled to be released in Kannada, along with the dubbed versions of Telugu, Tamil, Hindi, and Malayalam languages.

References

External links
 

Upcoming Kannada-language films
Upcoming Indian films
2023 films
Indian action films
2020s Kannada-language films